Nooitgedacht Dam Nature Reserve is a park near Carolina in Mpumalanga, South Africa, situated on the Komati River.

See also
Nooitgedacht Dam

Mpumalanga Provincial Parks
Nature reserves in South Africa